Not a Little Girl Anymore may refer to:

 Not a Little Girl Anymore (Prudence Liew album), 1992
 Not a Little Girl Anymore (Linda Lewis album), 1975